Frederick Reese may refer to:

 Frederick D. Reese (1929–2018), African-American civil rights activist from Selma, Alabama
 Frederick F. Reese (James Frederick Rees; 1854–1936), 238th bishop of the Episcopal Church in the United States of America

See also
 Frederick Rees (1883–1967), Welsh historian and academic